HD 83332 (HR 3830) is a solitary, orange hued star located in the southern constellation Antlia. It has an apparent magnitude of 5.68, making it faintly visible to the naked eye if viewed under ideal conditions.

HD 83332 has a classification of K0 III, which suggests it is an evolved giant star, as stellar models place it on the red giant branch. It radiates at 52.7 times the luminosity of the Sun  from its enlarged photosphere at an effective temperature of 4,610 K. HD 83332 has a solar metallicity, 112% that of the Sun to be exact, and is a member of the thin disk.

References

K-type giants
Antlia
CD-24 08272
3830
047187
083332
High-proper-motion stars
Antliae, 16